Cherry Grove is a census-designated place (CDP) in Clark County, Washington, United States. The population was 546 at the 2010 census, down from 663 at the 2000 census.

Geography
Cherry Grove is located in central Clark County at  (45.799888, -122.579093). It is bordered to the southeast by the city of Battle Ground, to the east by Lewisville, and to the southwest by Dollars Corner.

Demographics
As of the census of 2000, there were 663 people, 214 households, and 185 families residing in the CDP. The population density was 197.4 people per square mile (76.2/km2). There were 227 housing units at an average density of 67.6/sq mi (26.1/km2). The racial makeup of the CDP was 91.86% White, 1.96% African American, 0.45% Native American, 0.15% Asian, 3.17% from other races, and 2.41% from two or more races. Hispanic or Latino of any race were 5.28% of the population. 30.1% were of German, 17.6% American, 12.3% Finnish, 9.3% English and 6.2% Norwegian ancestry according to Census 2000.

There were 214 households, out of which 40.2% had children under the age of 18 living with them, 76.2% were married couples living together, 5.6% had a female householder with no husband present, and 13.1% were non-families. 10.3% of all households were made up of individuals, and 5.6% had someone living alone who was 65 years of age or older. The average household size was 3.10 and the average family size was 3.32.

In the CDP, the age distribution of the population shows 30.0% under the age of 18, 6.8% from 18 to 24, 26.4% from 25 to 44, 28.1% from 45 to 64, and 8.7% who were 65 years of age or older. The median age was 39 years. For every 100 females, there were 99.1 males. For every 100 females age 18 and over, there were 100.9 males.

The median income for a household in the CDP was $58,750, and the median income for a family was $64,000. Males had a median income of $40,750 versus $24,408 for females. The per capita income for the CDP was $20,760. None of the families and 1.7% of the population were living below the poverty line, including no under eighteens and none of those over 64.

References

Census-designated places in Clark County, Washington
Census-designated places in Washington (state)